The Romania–Serbia border is the international border between Romania and Serbia, established after the formation of the United Principalities of Moldavia and Wallachia (later renamed to Romania) in 1859 and the partition of Banat after the Treaty of Trianon.

Both countries have several border crossing points. Among them are those of Vrbica–Vălcani, Golubac–Moldova Nouă, Kladovo–Drobeta-Turnu Severin and several others. Many of these points were temporarily closed in 2020 as a result of the COVID-19 pandemic. The point where the borders of Hungary, Romania and Serbia coincide is known as the "Triplex Confinium". Precisely, the towns that meet each other are Kübekháza (Hungary), Beba Veche (Romania) and Rabe (Serbia). Cultural events are held in this point every year.

See also
Borders of Romania
Borders of Serbia
Romanian–Yugoslav land swap

References

External links

 
European Union external borders
Borders of Romania
Borders of Serbia
International borders